Karen Marie Løwert (27 January 1914 – 11 February 2002) was a Danish actress. She appeared in more than 25 films between 1933 and 1992.

Selected filmography
 Life on the Hegn Farm (1938)
 Wir Wunderkinder (1958)
 Onkel Bill fra New York (1959)
 Once There Was a War (1966)

References

External links

1914 births
2002 deaths
Danish film actresses
Place of birth missing